Veyilmarangal is a Malayalam language drama film written and directed by Bijukumar Damodaran and produced by Baby Mathew Somatheeram. The film starring Indrans and Prakash Bare has M. J. Radhakrishnan as cinematographer. It revolves around a Dalit family that moves to Himachal Pradesh from Kerala for betterment, but harsh conditions still pursue them.

Veyilmarangal is the first Indian film to win an award in main competition for Golden Goblet in Shanghai International Film Festival. The film was theatrically released on 28 February 2020.

Cast
 Indrans
 Sarita Kukku
 Krishnan Balakrishnan
 Prakash Bare
 Master Govardhan
 Ashok Kumar
 Nariyapuram Venu
 Melvin Williams

Release
The film was theatrically released on 28 February 2020.

Awards
Outstanding Artistic Achievement award at Shanghai International Film Festival.
Best actor award for Indrans at Singapore South Asian International Film Festival
NETPAC Award for Best Malayalam Film  at International Film Festival of Kerala
 Jury Prize for Best Film  at 8th Festival des cinémas indiens de Toulouse/Toulouse Indian Film Festival , France.
 Best International Feature Film Award at Chongqing Pioneer Art Film Festival, China 2020

Festival selections 
 2019 Shanghai International Film Festival, China 22nd festival - Official Competition for Golden Goblet
 Singapore South Asia Film Festival, 2019- Official Competition
 Asia Pacific screen awards, Australia 2019- In Competition
 25th Kolkata International Film Festival 2019 – In Indian film Competition
 14th JOGJA NETPAC Asian Film Festival, Indonesia 2019- Asian Perspective section
 18th Dhaka International Film Festival, Bangladesh 2020- Asian Competition
 24th International Film Festival Kerala, 2019 – New Malayalam Cinema Competition
 50th International Film Festival of India, Goa, 2019 – Indian cinema section
 Pune International Film Festival, India 2020 – Indian Cinema Section.
Aurangabad International Film Festival, India 2020 – Indian Competition.
 Chennai Independent Film Festival, India 2020 – Opening Film
 Toulouse Indian Film Festival, France, April 2020.
 Chongqing Pioneer Art Film Festival, China 2020.

References

External links
 

Films directed by Dr. Biju
2019 films
2010s Malayalam-language films
Indian drama films
2019 drama films
Films about social issues in India
Films set in Kerala
Films shot in Kollam
Films set in Himachal Pradesh